Miss USA 1952 was the inaugural Miss USA pageant, held at the Long Beach Municipal Auditorium in Long Beach, California on June 27, 1952. 

At the end of the event, American actress and Miss America 1941 Rosemary LaPlanche crowned Jackie Loughery of New York as Miss USA 1952. It is the first victory of New York in the pageant's history. Contestants from 42 states competed in this year's pageant.

Results

Placements

Special awards

Contestants 
42 contestants competed for the title.

Notes

References

External links
 Miss USA official website

1952
1952 beauty pageants
1952 in California